Adenophyllum wrightii is a North American species of flowering plants in the family Asteraceae known by the common names San Felipe dogweed, San Felipe dyssodia and Wright's dogweed. It is native to Mexico and the US States of Arizona and New Mexico. The species was long thought to be extinct in New Mexico, but live populations were rediscovered in the state in 1999.

References

Tageteae
Flora of New Mexico
Plants described in 1854
Flora of Arizona
Flora of Chihuahua (state)